William Smith (born 1826) was born in Providence, Rhode Island and was a Union Navy sailor during the American Civil War who received America's highest military decoration the Medal of Honor for his actions at Cherbourg, France.

Medal of Honor citation

Citation:
Served as second quartermaster on board the U.S.S. Kearsarge when she destroyed the Alabama off Cherbourg, France, 19 June 1864. Acting as captain of the 11-inch pivot gun of the second division, Smith carried out his duties courageously and deserved special notice for the deliberate and cool manner in which he acted throughout the bitter engagement. It is stated by rebel officers that this gun was more destructive and did more damage than any other gun of Kearsarge.

See also

List of American Civil War Medal of Honor recipients: Q–S

Notes

1826 births
Year of death missing
Union Navy sailors
United States Navy Medal of Honor recipients
People from Concord, New Hampshire
American Civil War recipients of the Medal of Honor